Zafra selasphora is a species of sea snail in the family Columbellidae, the dove snails.

Description
The shell grows to a length of 3.5 mm.

Distribution
This species is distributed in the Mediterranean Sea, the Red Sea, the Persian Gulf and in the Indian Ocean along the Aldabra Atoll

References

 Taylor, J.D. (1973). Provisional list of the mollusca of Aldabra Atoll.
 Streftaris, N.; Zenetos, A.; Papathanassiou, E. (2005). Globalisation in marine ecosystems: the story of non-indigenous marine species across European seas. Oceanogr. Mar. Biol. Annu. Rev. 43: 419–453
 

selasphora
Gastropods described in 1901